

The Holcomb Perigee was a prototype sportsplane built in the United States in 1987 by Jerry Holcomb. Originally known as the Ultra-IMP, it was a refinement of the Aerocar Micro-IMP and attempted to overcome the major shortcoming of that design - a lack of power - by replacing the adapted automobile engine that had been used in its predecessor with an engine designed to power ultralights.

See also

1980s United States sport aircraft
High-wing aircraft
Single-engined pusher aircraft